Galway was a parliamentary constituency represented in Dáil Éireann, the lower house of the Irish parliament or Oireachtas from 1921 to 1937. The method of election was proportional representation by means of the single transferable vote (PR-STV).

History 
It was the largest constituency in Ireland, electing 7 deputies (Teachtaí Dála, commonly known as TDs) to the Dáil in 1921 and 1922, and 9 from 1923 to 1937. The constituency was created in 1921 as a 7-seat constituency, under the Government of Ireland Act 1920, for the 1921 elections to the House of Commons of Southern Ireland. That House had only a brief existence, as only four members took their seats, the remainder forming the Second Dáil.

Under the Electoral Act 1923, it became a 9-seat constituency for the 1923 general election to the 4th Dáil. Its representation remained at 9 seats until its abolition at the 1937 general election, under the Electoral (Revision of Constituencies) Act 1935.

Boundaries 
Some Dáil constituencies extend across the county boundaries, to ensure a reasonably consistent ratio of electors to TDs. The mathematics make this less likely to be necessary in a large constituency such as this one, and the 1923 Act defined the boundaries of the Galway constituency simply as: "The administrative county of Galway." No boundary revisions took place until the abolition of the constituency under the 1935 Act.

TDs

Elections

1936 by-election 
Following the death of Fine Gael TD Patrick Hogan, a by-election was held on 13 August 1936. The seat was won by the Fianna Fáil candidate Martin Neilan, reaching the quota on the first count. A second count occurred because the distribution of the surplus could have saved another candidate their election deposit.

1935 by-election 
Following the death of Fine Gael TD Martin McDonogh, a by-election was held on 19 June 1935.

1933 general election

1932 general election

September 1927 general election

June 1927 general election

1923 general election 
Full figures for the fifth through to the eighteenth counts are unavailable.

1922 general election

1921 general election 

|}

See also
Dáil constituencies
Politics of the Republic of Ireland
Historic Dáil constituencies
Elections in the Republic of Ireland

References

External links
Oireachtas Members Database

Dáil constituencies in the Republic of Ireland (historic)
Historic constituencies in County Galway
Politics of Galway (city)
1921 establishments in Ireland
1937 disestablishments in Ireland
Constituencies established in 1921
Constituencies disestablished in 1937